Rayners Lane is a suburban district in the London Borough of Harrow that forms the western part of Harrow. Located between Pinner and West Harrow, it takes its name from a road in the area, also called Rayners Lane (formerly also spelt Rayner's Lane) which runs from Marsh Road in Pinner to Eastcote Lane in South Harrow.

History
During the Middle Ages the Rayners Lane road was used when transporting grain to the mill on Pinner Green. The road was originally called Bourne Lane as it crossed several streams including the Yeading Brook. During the first half of the nineteenth century the area was in the hands of the Rayner family, who owned a farm. The area was drastically built up between 1929 and 1938 by Harrow's biggest interwar housebuilder T.F. Nash, who created a shopping parade on Alexandra Avenue. The area to the north of the tube station was originally named Harrow Garden Village by its developer, and was one of Metro-land's flagship points.

Former Cunard officer Commodore Harry Grattidge, one of the last captains of the RMS Queen Elizabeth, lived at number 33 High Worple, Rayners Lane until his death in the 1970s.

The area is most widely known as the location of Rayners Lane tube station, first built in 1906, and most of the settlement is built around the tube station.  The station links both the Metropolitan and Piccadilly lines and therefore has good connections with the rest of London.

The other principal point of architectural interest is the former cinema, an Art Deco building featuring a curved projection on the front somewhat resembling an elephant's trunk. This is a listed building. It is currently occupied by the Zoroastrian Trust Funds of Europe, and is used as a Zoroastrian centre - the only official temple of its type in the UK. Before this, it was an Odeon cinema.

Despite being a relatively small area, it boasts many retail chains, mainly due to the presence of the tube station, including Sainsbury's Local, Tesco Express, Pizza Hut, Subway, Costa Coffee and KFC. Up until the end of 2017, the head office of the bookmaking and e-gaming company Ladbrokes was based in Rayners Lane. The area's last remaining bank, Santander UK closed in June 2019.

Demography
The largest ethnic group in Rayners Lane ward in the 2011 census was Indian (28%), followed by White British (27%) and other Asian (21%). It has one of London's largest Tamil communities.

Sport
The area also has its own football club, Rayners Lane F.C. who currently play in the Spartan South Midlands Football League, Division One.

It also has a sports club called Harrow Town Sports club which has been in existence since the 1890s. It is the home of the Harrow Town Cricket Club, the Venceremos FC and the HT Tennis Club.

Notable people

Dev Patel 
Dev Patel is a BAFTA award-winning internationally renowned British actor who grew up in Rayners Lane.

Jai Paul 
Jai Paul is an electronic music recording artist signed to XL Recordings, whose influential songs of the 2010s have been sampled by Drake and Beyoncé. He and his brother A. K. Paul grew up in Rayners Lane.

Transport

London Underground
Rayners Lane Station (Metropolitan line and Piccadilly line)

Bus routes

 398
 H9
 H10
 H12

Nearby places
South Harrow
North Harrow
Pinner
Eastcote
West Harrow
Ruislip

References

Sources

Conservation Area Appraisal

Districts of the London Borough of Harrow
Areas of London
Streets in the London Borough of Harrow
Middlesex
District centres of London